The 72nd Field Artillery Brigade is an AC/RC unit based at Joint Base McGuire-Dix-Lakehurst, New Jersey.  The unit is responsible for training selected United States Army Reserve and National Guard units along the East coast.  The brigade is a subordinate unit of First Army Division East, First United States Army.

History

World War I
under construction

World War II
Reactivated in 1940, the brigade was formed with a 155mm gun regiment and two 155mm howitzer regiments. Between June and August 1941, the brigade formed a provisional 72nd Antitank Battalion using assets from the antitank batteries and platoons of the regiments. Activated 5 August 1941, the battalion participated in the Second Army (United States) Maneuvers along with 2nd Battalion, 119th Field Artillery, as part of VII Army Corps.

Cold War
From 1 June 1958 until 15 May 1992, the brigade served as part of VII Corps Artillery in Germany.

Global War on Terror
The brigade was reactivated on 1 December 2006 by reflagging the 5th Brigade, 78th Division. As an AC/RC unit subordinate to First Army Division East, the brigade plans, coordinates, and enables post-mobilization, pre-deployment training in support of specified U.S. Army Reserve, Army National Guard, Navy, Air Force and Coast Guard units. On order, 72nd Field Artillery Brigade provides pre-mobilization training assistance within its capabilities for Army Reserve and Army National Guard units.

Lineage & honors

Lineage 
Constituted 24 October 1917 in the National Army as the 349th Field Artillery and assigned to the 92d Division
Organized 2 November 1917 at Camp Dix, New Jersey
Demobilized 17 March 1919 at Camp Dix, New Jersey
Reconstituted 4 September 1930 in the Organized Reserves as the 349th Field Artillery
Withdrawn 1 August 1940 from the Organized Reserves, allotted to the Regular Army, and activated at Fort Sill, Oklahoma
Headquarters and Headquarters Battery reorganized and redesignated 1 March 1943 as Headquarters and Headquarters Battery, 349th Field Artillery Group (remainder of regiment – hereafter separate lineages)
Headquarters and Headquarters Battery, 349th Field Artillery Group, inactivated 26 May 1946 in Germany
Redesignated 5 February 1947 as Headquarters and Headquarters Battery, 72d Field Artillery Group
Activated 17 December 1954 in Germany
Redesignated 1 June 1958 as Headquarters and Headquarters Battery, 72d Artillery Group
Redesignated 15 March 1972 as Headquarters and Headquarters Battery, 72d Field Artillery Group
Redesignated 1 September 1980 as Headquarters and Headquarters Battery, 72d Field Artillery Brigade
Inactivated 15 May 1992 in Germany
Headquarters activated 1 December 2006 at Fort George G. Meade, Maryland

Campaign participation credit
World War I: Lorraine, 1918
World War II: Rhineland; Central Europe

Heraldry

Shoulder Sleeve Insignia

Description/Blazon: Centered on a red rectangular device arched at the top and bottom and edged with a 1/8 inch (.32 cm) yellow border, the overall dimensions 2 inches (5.08 cm) in width and 3 inches (7.62 cm) in height, a black disc within a yellow ring surmounted above and below by two yellow pheons with white shafts, the topmost pointed to upper right, the lower one pointed to lower left. 

Symbolism: Scarlet and yellow are the colors associated with Field Artillery. The cannonball or black disc centered on the yellow one connotes accuracy of fire. The pheons (arrowheads) are symbolic of fire power and their configuration with the yellow disc forms an allusion to the unit's numerical designation, 72. 

Background: The shoulder sleeve insignia was approved effective 16 September 1980. (TIOH Drawing Number A-1-657)

Distinctive Unit Insignia

Description/Blazon: A gold color metal and enamel device 1 3/16 inches (3.02 cm) in width overall consisting of two gold ramrods in saltire between three black gunstones and red flames in front of a vertical gold cannon barrel, all above a gold scroll bearing the inscription "ON TIME ON TARGET" in black letters. 

Symbolism: Scarlet is the color used for Field Artillery. The cannon and ramrods symbolize the basic mission of Field Artillery. The three gunstones and flames allude to the organization's three battle honors earned during World War I and World War II in Lorraine, Rhineland and Central Europe. 

Background: The distinctive unit insignia was originally approved for the 72d Artillery Group on 16 August 1968. It was redesignated for the 72d Field Artillery Group on 7 April 1972. The insignia was redesignated effective 16 September 1980 for the 72d Field Artillery Brigade.

References

External links
72nd FA BDE Website

072|Field Artillery 072
Military units and formations established in 1917